Julie Lynn Skinner ( Sutton, born April 23, 1968 in Calgary, Alberta) is a retired Canadian curler and Olympic medallist from Victoria, British Columbia. She received a bronze medal at the 2002 Winter Olympics in Salt Lake City. She is also a former world champion from 2000.

After winning the 1987 Canadian Junior Curling Championships, Skinner became the junior world champion in 1988, as skip for the Canadian team. She also won the 1986 Canadian Junior Women's Curling Championship playing third for her sister Jodie Sutton.

Personal life
At the time of her World junior championship title, Skinner was a student at the University of Victoria and was from Oliver, British Columbia. She is the twin sister of her teammate Jodie Sutton.

References

External links

1968 births
Living people
Canadian women curlers
Canadian women's curling champions
Olympic curlers of Canada
Olympic bronze medalists for Canada
Olympic medalists in curling
Curlers at the 1992 Winter Olympics
Curlers at the 2002 Winter Olympics
Medalists at the 2002 Winter Olympics
World curling champions
Continental Cup of Curling participants
Canada Cup (curling) participants
Curlers from Victoria, British Columbia
People from Oliver, British Columbia
University of Victoria alumni
Twin sportspeople